Momodou Malcolm Jallow (born 11 October 1975) is a Gambian-born Swedish politician. He has been a regular Member of Parliament since 2017, elected for Malmö Municipality constituency.

He became a Member of the Riksdag in 2017 after Daniel Sestrajcic left. Jallow was elected as Member of the Riksdag in September 2018 and September 2022.

References

See also 
 List of members of the Riksdag, 2014–2018
 List of members of the Riksdag, 2018–2022
 List of members of the Riksdag, 2022–2026

Living people
1975 births
Members of the Riksdag 2014–2018
Members of the Riksdag 2018–2022
Members of the Riksdag 2022–2026
Members of the Riksdag from the Left Party (Sweden)
Swedish people of Gambian descent
Gambian emigrants to Sweden
21st-century Swedish politicians
Politicians from Malmö